The AN-22 was France's second air-dropped nuclear weapon, developed as a replacement for the earlier AN-11 bomb, entering service in 1967. It had a similar 60 to 70 kilotons yield fission warhead to the earlier AN-11, but with enhanced safety features and a parachute retarder to enable it to be dropped at low level. Additionally the casing was redesigned reducing its weight from approximately 1,400 kg (3,000 lb) to around 700 kg (1,500 lb). It was carried by the Dassault Mirage IV P (nuclear Penetration).

A stockpile of about 40 weapons was maintained, providing one for each of the 36 Mirage IVAs in service, plus several spares. The last warhead was retired on 1 July 1988, at which point the ASMP stand-off weapon took over the role previously held by the AN-22.

See also
 Force de frappe

References
 http://nuclearweaponarchive.org/France/FranceArsenalDev.html

Nuclear bombs of France
Military equipment introduced in the 1960s